The 1st Cavalry Division (1. Kavallerie-Division) was a unit of the German Army in World War I. The division was formed on the mobilization of the German Army in August 1914. The division was disbanded in 1919 during the demobilization of the German Army after World War I.

Combat chronicle 
Initially, it was the sole cavalry division on the Eastern Front, where it was assigned to the 8th Army. It remained in the East throughout the war. From 6 January 1915 to 22 August 1917, the division was involved in coastal defence duties in northern Courland. It was transferred to the Ukraine in March 1918, where it remained until 29 January 1919. From 16 January 1918, it contained just one brigade of 3 regiments.

Battle Calendar 
The Division was formed as Part of the Mobilization at the Beginning of the First World War and was used exclusively on the Eastern Front. Here it remained as a German Police Force after the Peace of Brest-Litovsk. It was first used in Livonia and Estonia and then came to Ukraine, where it remained until 16 March 1919.

1914
– 17 August – Battle of Stallupönen
19 to 20 August – Battle of Gumbinnen
23–31 August – Battle of Tannenberg
5–15 September – Battle of the Masurian Lakes
25 to 30 September – Battle of the Njemen
1 October to 5 November – position Fights at Grajewo-Wizajny
6–8 November – Battle of Göritten
13–16 November – Battle of the Romintener Heath
From 15 November – jockeying for position for The Field position at Lötzen and at the Angerapp

1915
– Until 7 February – jockeying for position for the Field Position Lötzen-Angerapp. 
8–22 February – Winter Battle in Masuren
23 February to 6 March – Battles at the Bobr
7–16 March – Battles in the Border position Sereje-Simno-Luzhwinov and Mariampol 9–12 March – Battles at Sejny
25–30 March – Battles at Krasnopol and Krasne
31 March to 20 July – Position Battles between Augustov, Mariampol and Pilwiszki
21 July to 7 August – battles at the Jesia and at Wejwery
8–18 August – Siege of Kowno
19 August to 8 September – Njemen battle
9 September– Szyrwinty
9 to 24 September – Battle of Vilnius
24 September to 19 October – Battles at the Mjadsjolka and Dryswjata
From 6 November – Coastal Protection in Northern Courland

1916
– Coastal Protection Northern Courland

1917
– Until 22 August – Coastal Protection North Kurland 
23 January to 3 February – Winter Battle on the Aa
1–5 September – Battle of Riga
6 September to 28 October – Position Battles north of the Düna
From 29 October – Crew service at Budget Inspection 10

1918
– Until 10 March – Crew service at Budget Inspection 10
11 March to 2 May – Occupation of Livonia and Estonia as a German Police force
3 May to 21 June – Fighting in Ukraine
22 June to 15 November – Occupation of Ukraine
From 16 November – Eviction of Ukraine

1919
– Until 16 March – Evacuation of the Ukraine

Order of Battle on mobilisation 
On formation, in August 1914, the component units of the division were:

1st Cavalry Brigade (from I Corps District)
3rd (East Prussian) Cuirassiers "Count Wrangel"
1st (Lithuanian) Dragoons "Prince Albrecht of Prussia"
2nd Cavalry Brigade (from I Corps District)
12th (Lithuanian) Uhlans
9th Jäger zu Pferde
41st Cavalry Brigade (from XX Corps District)
5th (West Prussian) Cuirassiers "Duke Frederick Eugene of Württemberg"
4th (1st Pomeranian) Uhlans "von Schmidt"
Horse Artillery Abteilung of the 1st (1st Lithuanian) Field Artillery "Prince August of Prussia" Regiment
5th Machine Gun Detachment
Pioneer Detachment
Signals Detachment
Heavy Wireless Station 17
Light Wireless Station 7
Light Wireless Station 14
Cavalry Motorised Vehicle Column 1

See: Table of Organisation and Equipment

Late World War I organization 
In the course of the War, the Division saw a number of changes to its assigned Brigades.
1st Cavalry Brigade became independent on 3 October 1916.
41st Cavalry Brigade was transferred to 7th Cavalry Division on 17 October 1916.
8th Cavalry Brigade joined from 2nd Cavalry Division on 25 July 1916 before moving on to the 6th Cavalry Division on 18 October 1916.
18th Cavalry Brigade joined from 4th Cavalry Division on 12 December 1916 before moving on to XXXXI Reserve Corps on 15 January 1918.
23rd Cavalry Brigade joined from 8th Cavalry Division on 1 February 1917 before becoming independent on 22 October 1917.

Allied Intelligence did not rate the Division's fighting value. Its late war organisation was:

2nd Cavalry Brigade
3rd (East Prussian) Cuirassiers "Count Wrangel"
1st (Lithuanian) Dragoons "Prince Albrecht of Prussia"
12th (Lithuanian) Uhlans
Horse Artillery Abteilung of the 1st (Prince August of Prussia) (1st Lithuanian) Field Artillery Regiment
Horse Artillery Abteilung of the 35th (1st West Prussian) Field Artillery Regiment
1st Pioneer Detachment
347th Searchlight Section
70th Ambulance Company
66th Vet. Hospital
142nd Vet. Hospital
152nd Cyclist Company
153rd Cyclist Company
159th Cyclist Company

See also 

German Army (German Empire)
German cavalry in World War I
German Army order of battle (1914)

References

Bibliography 
 
 
 
 

Cavalry divisions of Germany in World War I
Military units and formations established in 1914
Military units and formations disestablished in 1919